= L. Walter Macior =

- Born: Walter Aloysius Macior Jr. August 26, 1926; Yonkers
- Died: October 5, 2007 (aged 81)

Academic background
- Education: Columbia University; University of Wisconsin
- Thesis: The tetrakaidecahedron and related cell forms in undifferentiated plant tissues (1960)

Lazarus Walter Macior (August 26, 1926 Yonkers - October 5, 2007) was an American botanist. He was professor emeritus and Distinguished Professor in Biology at the University of Akron.

== Life ==
Walter Aloysius Macior Jr. was the son of Walter Aloysius Macior and Alice Mary Macior. He graduated from Columbia University, and from the University of Wisconsin.

He served in World War II as a Japanese linguist. He became a member of the Franciscan Friars of the Assumption, in 1956. He was professor at the University of Akron, from 1967 to 2000. He was a Faculty Research Associate at the University of California, Davis, in 1984.

A scholarship at the University of Akron was named for him.

== Works ==
- Macior, Lazarus Walter (1971-02-01). "Co-Evolution of Plants and Animals. Systematic Insights from Plant-Insect Interactions". Taxon. 20 (1): 17–28. doi:10.2307/1218530. JSTOR 1218530.
- Macior, Lazarus Walter (1966-03-01). "Foraging Behavior of Bombus (Hymenoptera: Apidae) in Relation to Aquilegia Pollination". American Journal of Botany. 53 (3): 302–309. doi:10.2307/2439803. JSTOR 2439803.
- Macior, Lazarus Walter (1970-07-01). "The Pollination Ecology of Pedicularis in Colorado". American Journal of Botany. 57 (6): 716–728. doi:10.2307/2441296. JSTOR 2441296.
- MACIOR, L. W. (1982-01-01). "Plant community and pollinator dynamics in the evolution of pollination mechanisms in Pedicularis (Scrophulariaceae)". Pollination and Evolution: 29–45.
- Macior, W. A. and E. B. Matzke 1951. "An Experimental Analysis of Cell-Wall Curvatures, and Approximations to Minimal Tetrakaidecahedra in the Leaf Parenchyma of Rhoeo discolor." American Journal of Botany 38(10): 783–793.
